Scotland women's national under-19 football team represents Scotland at the UEFA Women's Under-19 Championship and the FIFA U-20 Women's World Cup.

History

UEFA Women's Under-19 Championship

The Scottish team has participated in the UEFA Women's Under-19 Championship six times, but has yet to progress past the group stage. Scotland hosted the 2019 finals in July 2019.

Minor Tournaments

Coaches
Tony Gervaise (2005–2009)
Shelley Kerr (2009–2013)
Gareth Evans (2013–2017)
Pauline Hamill (2017–present)

See also
 Scotland women's national football team
 Scotland women's national under-17 football team
 FIFA U-20 Women's World Cup
 UEFA Women's Under-19 Championship

References

Women's national under-19 association football teams
F
European women's national under-19 association football teams